Rostaq, also rendered as Rastagh, may refer to:

Rostaq, Afghanistan (village), a village in Takhar Province, Afghanistan
Rustaq District, Afghanistan, a district in Takhar Province, Afghanistan
Rostaq, Fars, Iran
Rostaq, Hormozgan, Iran
Rostaq District, an administrative subdivision of Iran
Rostaq Rural District (disambiguation), administrative subdivisions of Iran
 Rustaq, a city in Oman